David McKie Loggie (born 31 May 1957) is an English retired professional footballer who played as a striker. After playing in the Football League with Burnley and York City, he had a successful career in The Netherlands and Belgium.

References

David Loggie profile at Voetbal International

1957 births
Living people
People from Newbiggin-by-the-Sea
Footballers from Northumberland
English footballers
English expatriate footballers
Association football forwards
Burnley F.C. players
York City F.C. players
Lierse S.K. players
Sparta Rotterdam players
AZ Alkmaar players
Willem II (football club) players
SC Cambuur players
Expatriate footballers in Belgium
Expatriate footballers in the Netherlands
English Football League players
Belgian Pro League players
Eredivisie players
English expatriate sportspeople in Belgium
English expatriate sportspeople in the Netherlands